Thaksinlek Kiatniwat (ทักษิณเล็ก เกียรตินิวัฒน์) is a Muay Thai fighter and the current WMO Super Lightweight World Champion.

Muay thai career
On June 9, 2017, Thaksinlek faced the former WMC and Channel 7 welterweight champion Littewada Sitthikul. Littewada won the fight by a third-round knockout.

Thaksinlek was scheduled to face Thanonchai Thanakorngym on November 1, 2020. He won the fight by decision.

Thansinlek was booked to face the former Channel 7 Boxing Stadium super lightweight champion Ferrari Fairtex on December 13, 2020. He lost the fight by decision.

On March 21, 2021, it was announced that Thaksinlek has signed with Petchyindee, as his previous camp was unable to arrange fights at his preferred weight.

Thaksinlek faced Kaonar P.K. Saenchai Muaythaigym at SuekMahakamMuayRuamPonKon Chana + Petchyindee on April 8, 2021, in his first fight after having signed with Petchyindee. He won the fight by decision.

Thaksinlek faced Rungkao Wor.Sanprapai at Muaymanwansuk on October 22, 2021. He won the fight by decision.

Thaksinlek faced the former Rajadamnern Stadium lightweight champion Rungkit Wor.Sanprapai at Muaymanwansuk	on November 12, 2021. He lost the fight by decision.

Thaksinlek faced Rungkao Wor.Sanprapai for the vacant WMO World Lightweight title on December 30, 2021. He won the fight by decision.

Thaksinlek fought a rematch with Rungkit Wor.Sanprapai at the February 17, 2022 Petchyindee event. He won the fight by decision.

Titles and accomplishments
World Muay Thai Organization
 2021 WMO World Lightweight Champion

Onesongchai
 2012 S-1 118 lbs Champion

 True4U Petchyindee 
 2022 True4U 140 lbs Champion

Fight record

|-  style="background:#cfc;"
| 2023-03-01|| Win ||align=left| Petchchaimek Sor.Jor.Tongprajin || CPF Muaymansananlok || Nakhon Sawan, Thailand || Decision (unanimous) || 5 || 3:00
|-
! style=background:white colspan=9 |

|-  style="background:#fbb"
| 2022-12-28 || Loss ||align=left| Capitan Petchyindee Academy || Muay Thai Rakya Soosakon + SAT Super Fight Withee Tin Thai + Petchyindee  || Bangkok, Thailand || KO (Straight to the body)|| 3 ||1:18

|-  style="background:#cfc;"
| 2022-11-25|| Win ||align=left| Rungkit Wor.Sanprapai || Muaymanwansuk, Rangsit Stadium ||Pathum Thani, Thailand || Decision ||5 ||3:00
|-
! style=background:white colspan=9 |
|-  style="background:#cfc;"
| 2022-09-06||Win ||align=left| Ratchasing PetchyindeeAcademy || Muaymansananmuang, Rangsit Stadium || Pathum Thani, Thailand || Decision || 5 ||3:00 

|-  style="background:#fbb;"
| 2022-08-11|| Loss ||align=left| Rungkit Wor.Sanprapai || Petchyindee, Rajadamnern Stadium ||Bangkok, Thailand || Decision || 5||3:00 

|-  style="background:#fbb;"
| 2022-05-13|| Loss ||align=left| Rangkhao Wor.Sangprapai || Muaymanwansuk, Rangsit Stadium|| Pathum Thani, Thailand || KO (Elbow) || 3 || 
|-  style="background:#c5d2ea;"
| 2022-03-27||Draw ||align=left| Rangkhao Wor.Sangprapai || MAX Muay Thai|| Pattaya, Thailand || Decision || 3 ||3:00 
|-  style="background:#cfc;"
| 2022-02-17||Win ||align=left| Rungkit Wor.Sanprapai||  Petchyindee, Rajadamnern Stadium || Bangkok, Thailand || Decision || 5 ||3:00 
|-  style="background:#cfc;"
| 2021-12-30|| Win||align=left| Rangkhao Wor.Sangprapai || Rangsit Stadium|| Pathum Thani, Thailand || Decision ||5  ||3:00 
|-
! style=background:white colspan=9 |
|-  style="background:#fbb;"
| 2021-11-12|| Loss ||align=left| Rungkit Wor.Sanprapai ||Muaymanwansuk || Thailand || Decision || 5 || 3:00
|-  style="background:#cfc;"
| 2021-10-22|| Win ||align=left| Rangkhao Wor.Sangprapai || Muaymanwansuk || Buriram province, Thailand || Decision || 5 || 3:00
|-  style="background:#cfc;"
| 2021-04-08|| Win ||align=left| Kaonar P.K. Saenchai Muaythaigym || SuekMahakamMuayRuamPonKon Chana + Petchyindee|| Songkhla province, Thailand || Decision || 5 || 3:00
|-  style="background:#FFBBBB;"
| 2020-12-13 || Loss||align=left| Ferrari Fairtex  || Channel 7 Stadium || Bangkok, Thailand || Decision || 5 || 3:00
|-  style="background:#cfc;"
| 2020-11-01 || Win||align=left| Thanonchai Thanakorngym  || Channel 7 Stadium || Bangkok, Thailand || Decision || 5 || 3:00
|-  style="background:#cfc;"
| 2020-07-22 || Win ||align=left| Siwakorn Kiatjaroenchai  || Rajadamnern Stadium || Bangkok, Thailand || Decision || 5 || 3:00
|-  style="background:#FFBBBB;"
| 2020-01-10 || Loss||align=left| Ferrari Jakrayanmuaythai  || Rajadamnern Stadium || Bangkok, Thailand || Decision || 5 || 3:00
|-  style="background:#FFBBBB;"
| 2019-10-17 || Loss||align=left| Thanonchai Thanakorngym  || Rajadamnern Stadium || Bangkok, Thailand || KO (Left Straight) || 4 ||
|-  style="background:#FFBBBB;"
| 2019-05-16 || Loss||align=left| Panpayak Sitchefboontham || Rajadamnern Stadium || Bangkok, Thailand || KO (Left Elbow) || 4 ||
|-  style="background:#FFBBBB;"
| 2019-04-11 || Loss||align=left| Yodpanomrung Jitmuangnon || Rajadamnern Stadium || Bangkok, Thailand || Decision  || 5 || 3:00
|-  style="background:#FFBBBB;"
| 2019-03-07 || Loss||align=left| Yodpanomrung Jitmuangnon || Rajadamnern Stadium || Bangkok, Thailand || Decision  || 5 || 3:00
|-  style="background:#FFBBBB;"
| 2019-01-02 || Loss||align=left| Lu Jun || Wu Lin Feng, -65 kg Tournament Quarter Finals|| Hengqin, China || Decision || 3 || 3:00
|-  style="background:#CCFFCC;"
| 2018-12-06|| Win ||align=left| Komawut FA.Group ||Rajadamnern Stadium || Bangkok, Thailand || KO || 3 ||
|-  style="background:#FFBBBB;"
| 2018-10-22|| Loss||align=left| Panpayak Sitchefboontham ||Rajadamnern Stadium || Bangkok, Thailand || KO (Left Elbow)|| 3 ||
|-  style="background:#CCFFCC;"
| 2018-08-30|| Win||align=left|  Ratchasing Ror.Kelacorach ||Rajadamnern Stadium || Bangkok, Thailand || Decision  || 5 || 3:00
|- style="background:#FFBBBB;"
| 2017-06-09 || Loss ||align=left| Littewada Sitthikul || Lumpinee Stadium || Bangkok, Thailand || KO || 3 ||
|-  style="background:#CCFFCC;"
| 2017-05-03 || Win ||align=left| Yodpanomrung Jitmuangnon || Rajadamnern Stadium || Bangkok, Thailand || Decision  || 5 || 3:00
|-  style="background:#CCFFCC;"
| 2017-01-12 || Win ||align=left| Grandprixnoi Phetkiatphet || Rajadamnern Stadium || Bangkok, Thailand || Decision  || 5 || 3:00
|-  style="background:#CCFFCC;"
| 2016-12-24 || Win ||align=left| Petpanomrung Kiatmuu9 || Yodmuay Thairath TV || Bangkok, Thailand || Decision || 5 || 3:00
|-  style="background:#CCFFCC;"
| 2016-12-03 || Win ||align=left| Chalamphet Tor.Laksong ||  || Thailand || Decision || 5 || 3:00
|-  style="background:#CCFFCC;"
| 2016-08-24 || Win ||align=left| Yok Parunchai || Rajadamnern Stadium || Thailand || Decision || 5 || 3:00
|-  style="background:#FFBBBB;"
| 2016-07-21|| Loss ||align=left| Muangthai PKSaenchaimuaythaigym ||  Rajadamnern Stadium || Bangkok, Thailand || KO (Left Elbow)|| 3 || 2:03
|-  style="background:#FFBBBB;"
| 2016-05-22|| Loss ||align=left| Superbank Mor Ratanabandit ||  Rajadamnern Stadium || Bangkok, Thailand || Decision || 5 || 3:00
|-  style="background:#FFBBBB;"
| 2016-02-24|| Loss||align=left| Saeksan Or. Kwanmuang||Rajadamnern Stadium || Bangkok, Thailand || Decision || 5 || 3:00
|-  style="background:#CCFFCC;"
| 2016-01-28 || Win ||align=left|  Yokvittaya Phetsimean  || Rajadamnern Stadium|| Bangkok, Thailand || Decision || 5 || 3:00
|-  style="background:#FFBBBB;"
| 2015-12-23|| Loss||align=left|   Muangthai PKSaenchaimuaythaigym || Rajadamnern Birthday Show, Rajadamnern Stadium || Bangkok, Thailand || KO (Left Elbow)|| 3 || 1:10
|-  style="background:#CCFFCC;"
| 2015-11-19 || Win ||align=left| Sangmanee Sor Tienpo   || Onesongchai Fights, Rajadamnern Stadium|| Bangkok, Thailand || Decision || 5 || 3:00
|-  style="background:#CCFFCC;"
| 2015-10-14 || Win ||align=left|  Grandprixnoi Phithakpabhadang  || Onesongchai Fights, Rajadamnern Stadium|| Bangkok, Thailand || Decision || 5 || 3:00
|-  style="background:#CCFFCC;"
| 2015-09-19 || Win ||align=left| Phetboonchu Sor.Sommai    || ||  Thailand || KO || 3 ||
|-  style="background:#FFBBBB;"
| 2015-07-29|| Loss||align=left| Rodlek Jaotalaytong || Rajadamnern Stadium || Bangkok, Thailand || Decision || 5 || 3:00
|-  style="background:#FFBBBB;"
| 2015-05-07|| Loss||align=left| Phet Utong Or. Kwanmuang  || Rajadamnern Stadium || Bangkok, Thailand || Decision || 5 || 3:00
|-  style="background:#FFBBBB;"
| 2015-03-30 || Loss||align=left| Thanonchai Thanakorngym || Rajadamnern Stadium || Bangkok, Thailand || Decision || 5 || 3:00
|-  style="background:#FFBBBB;"
| 2015-02-12 || Loss ||align=left| Phet Utong Or. Kwanmuang || Rajadamnern Stadium || Bangkok, Thailand || KO (Left Hook)|| 4 ||
|-  style="background:#FFBBBB;"
| 2015-01-08 || Loss ||align=left| Thanonchai Thanakorngym || Rajadamnern Stadium || Bangkok, Thailand || Decision || 5 || 3:00
|-  style="background:#FFBBBB;"
| 2014-12-09|| Loss||align=left| Superbank Mor Ratanabandit || Lumpinee Stadium || Bangkok, Thailand || Decision || 5 || 3:00 
|-
! style=background:white colspan=9 |
|-  style="background:#c5d2ea;"
| 2014-11-10|| Draw ||align=left| Superbank Mor Ratanabandit || Lumpinee Stadium || Bangkok, Thailand || Decision || 5 || 3:00
|-  style="background:#FFBBBB;"
| 2014-10-08|| Loss||align=left| Superbank Mor Ratanabandit || Lumpinee Stadium || Bangkok, Thailand || Decision || 5 || 3:00
|-  style="background:#FFBBBB;"
| 2014-09-05|| Loss||align=left| Superbank Mor Ratanabandit || Lumpinee Stadium || Bangkok, Thailand || Decision || 5 || 3:00
|-
! style=background:white colspan=9 |
|-  style="background:#CCFFCC;"
| 2014-08-14|| Win ||align=left| Sam-A Gaiyanghadao || Rajadamnern Stadium || Bangkok, Thailand || KO (head kick) || 2 ||
|-  style="background:#CCFFCC;"
| 2014-07-15 || Win||align=left| Superlek Kiatmuu9   || Lumpinee Stadium || Bangkok, Thailand || Decision || 5 || 3:00
|-  style="background:#CCFFCC;"
| 2014-06-02 || Win||align=left| Sangmanee Sor Tienpo  || Rajadamnern Stadium || Bangkok, Thailand || Decision || 5 || 3:00
|-  style="background:#CCFFCC;"
| 2014-05-07 || Win||align=left| Sangmanee Sor Tienpo  || Rajadamnern Stadium || Bangkok, Thailand || Decision || 5 || 3:00
|-  style="background:#CCFFCC;"
| 2014-01-14 || Win||align=left|  Denchiangkwan Lamtongkampat  || Siam Omnoi Boxing Stadium || Bangkok, Thailand || Decision || 5 || 3:00
|-  style="background:#FFBBBB;"
| 2013-12-02 || Loss||align=left|  Luknimit Singklongsi  || Lumpinee Stadium || Bangkok, Thailand || Decision || 5 || 3:00
|-  style="background:#CCFFCC;"
| 2013-11-06 || Win||align=left|  Naka Kaewsamrit  || Rajadamnern Stadium || Bangkok, Thailand || Decision || 5 || 3:00
|-  style="background:#FFBBBB;"
| 2013-10-08|| Loss||align=left|   Lamnamoon Sakchaichote || Lumpinee Stadium || Bangkok, Thailand || Decision || 5 || 3:00
|-  style="background:#FFBBBB;"
| 2013-07-16|| Loss||align=left|   Saenkeng KILA-Sport || Lumpinee Stadium || Bangkok, Thailand || Decision || 5 || 3:00
|-  style="background:#FFBBBB;"
| 2012-11-05 || Loss||align=left|  Chankrit Ekbangzai  || Rajadamnern Stadium || Bangkok, Thailand || Decision || 5 || 3:00
|-  style="background:#CCFFCC;"
| 2012-09-06 || Win||align=left|  Chokdee Por Telakul  ||  || Bangkok, Thailand || Decision || 5 || 3:00
|-  style="background:#CCFFCC;"
| 2012-07-02 || Win||align=left|   Tee-us Kor.Rachada  || Rajadamnern Stadium || Bangkok, Thailand || Decision || 5 || 3:00
|-  style="background:#FFBBBB;"
| 2012-06-06|| Loss||align=left|  Pichitchai Or.Bor.Tor.Kampi || Rajadamnern Stadium || Bangkok, Thailand || Decision || 5 || 3:00
|-  style="background:#CCFFCC;"
| 2011-04-26 || Win||align=left|  Petsila Sor.Tumrungsi	 || Lumpinee Stadium || Bangkok, Thailand || Decision || 5 || 3:00
|-
| colspan=9 | Legend:

References

Thaksinlek Kiatniwat
Living people
1995 births
Thaksinlek Kiatniwat